The 2009 FC Moscow season was the club's 6th, and final season as a professional team. They finished the season in 6th place, reached the Semi-final of the 2008–09 Russian Cup and the Quarterfinal of the 2009–10 Russian Cup.
Prior to the start of the 2010 Russian Premier League season, on 5 February 2010, FC Moscow announced that would not participate in the Russian Premier League with the club being officially excluded from the season on 17 February 2010.

Squad

On loan

Left club during season

Transfers

In

Loans in

Out

Loans out

Released

Competitions

Premier League

Results by round

Results

League table

Russian Cup

2008-09

2009-10

Squad statistics

Appearances and goals

|-
|colspan="14"|Players away from the club on loan:
|-
|colspan="14"|Players who appeared for Moscow but left during the season:

|}

Goal scorers

Clean sheets

Disciplinary record

References

FC Moscow seasons
Moscow